Guanella Pass (elevation ) is a high mountain pass in central Colorado, in the Rocky Mountains of the western United States.

The pass is located in southwestern Clear Creek County, in the Front Range west of Denver and south of Georgetown.  The pass was named in 1953 for Byron Guanella, a road supervisor and commissioner in Clear Creek County for nearly 50 years.

The pass provides a route between Georgetown in the valley of Clear Creek to the north and Grant in the valley of Geneva Creek, a tributary of the North Fork South Platte River, to the south. The pass is traversed by the Guanella Pass Scenic Byway. The road provides a link between Interstate 70 to the north and U.S. Highway 285 to the south. From Georgetown, take Clear County Route 381 south for 11 miles to the pass; from Grant, take Park County Route 62 13.5 miles to the pass. 

The entire route from Georgetown to U.S. Highway 285 is paved.  The road is no longer maintained in the winter and expect closure after the first heavy snow in the winter.  There is a parking area at the closure gate on the Georgetown side of the pass to allow access to the pass by foot or snowmobile during the winter.

At the summit of the pass, hiking trails lead east to Mount Bierstadt (elevation ) among other places.

The Geneva Basin Ski Area which existed from 1963 to 1984 was located just a few miles south of the pass.

References

External links
USGS TopoZone listing
CDOT

Mountain passes of Colorado
Landforms of Clear Creek County, Colorado
Transportation in Clear Creek County, Colorado
Colorado Scenic and Historic Byways